Leptospermum epacridoideum is a species of plant that is endemic to a restricted area of the South Coast of New South Wales. It is a bushy shrub with compact bark, elliptical to more or less circular leaves, white flowers arranged singly on short axillary side shoots, and woody fruit.

Description
The younger stems are thick and covered with tiny, fine hairs. There are reddish brown bracts and bracteoles around the base of the flower. Flowering mainly occurs from February to March and the fruit is a sessile, woody capsule  that eventually falls off.

Taxonomy
Leptospermum epacridoideum was formally described in 1919 by Edwin Cheel in the Journal and Proceedings of the Royal Society of New South Wales, originally incorrectly as Leptospermum epacridioideum.

Distribution and habitat
This tea-tree grows in forest and heath on sandstone in the area around Jervis Bay.

References

epacridoideum
Myrtales of Australia
Flora of New South Wales
Plants described in 1919